The following is a list of Winnipeg Blue Bombers all-time records and statistics current to the 2022 CFL season. Each category lists the top five players, where known, except for when the fifth place player is tied in which case all players with the same number are listed.

Tenure 

Most Games Played
394 – Bob Cameron (1980–2002)
293 – Troy Westwood (1991–2007, 2009)
249 – Chris Walby (1981–1996)
220 – Stan Mikawos (1982–1996)
199 – Milt Stegall (1995–2008)

Most Seasons Played
23 – Bob Cameron (1980–2002)
18 – Troy Westwood (1991–2007, 2009)
16 – Bill Ceretti (1933–1949)
16 – Chris Walby (1981–1996)
15 – Roger Savoie (1951–1965)
15 – Stan Mikawos (1982–1996)

Most Consecutive Games Played
353 – Bob Cameron (1980–2000)
279 – Troy Westwood (1991–2007)

Scoring 

Most Points – Career
2,748 – Troy Westwood (1991–2007, 2009)
1,840 – Trevor Kennerd (1980–1991)
890 – Milt Stegall (1995–2008)
802 – Justin Medlock (2016–2019)
673 – Bernie Ruoff (1975–1979)

Most Points – Season
227 – Justin Medlock – 2016
226 – Justin Medlock – 2017
213 – Troy Westwood – 1994
209 – Troy Westwood – 1993
202 – Troy Westwood – 2002

Most Points – Game
36 – Bob McNamara – versus BC Lions, October 13, 1956
30 – Ernie Pitts – versus Saskatchewan Roughriders, August 29, 1959
24 – Seven players, nine times

Most Touchdowns – Career
147 – Milt Stegall (1995–2008)
79 – Charles Roberts (2001–2008)
75 – Leo Lewis (1955–1966)
63 – Gerry James (1952–1963)
62 – James Murphy (1983–1990)

Most Touchdowns – Season
23 – Milt Stegall – 2002
19 – Gerry James – 2002
17 – Milt Stegall – 2005
16 – Ernie Pitts – 1959
16 – Ronald Williams – 1997
16 – Charles Roberts – 2007
16 – Dalton Schoen – 2022

Most Touchdowns – Game
6 – Bob McNamara – versus BC Lions, October 13, 1956
5 – Ernie Pitts – versus Saskatchewan Roughriders, August 29, 1959
4 – Seven players, nine times

Most Rushing Touchdowns – Career
64 – Charles Roberts (2001–2008)
57 – Gerry James (1952–1963)
48 – Leo Lewis (1955–1966)
44 – Willard Reaves (1983–1987)
30 – Jim Washington (1974–1979)

Most Rushing Touchdowns – Season
18 – Gerry James – 1957
16 – Ronald Williams – 1997
16 – Charles Roberts – 2007
15 – Robert Mimbs – 1991
14 – Willard Reaves – 1984

Most Rushing Touchdowns – Game
4 – Bob McNamara – at BC Lions, October 13, 1956
4 – Willard Reaves – versus Hamilton Tiger-Cats, September 15, 1984
4 – Tim Jessie – at Ottawa Rough Riders, July 25, 1989
4 – Charles Roberts – versus BC Lions, September 8, 2002
4 – Charles Roberts – at Edmonton Eskimos, June 28, 2007

Most Receiving Touchdowns – Career
144 – Milt Stegall (1995–2008)
61 – James Murphy (1983–1990)
54 – Ernie Pitts (1957–1969)
48 – Joe Poplawski (1978–1986)
46 – Jeff Boyd (1983–1987)
46 – Rick House (1979–1991)
46 – Terrence Edwards (2007–2013)

Most Receiving Touchdowns – Season
23 – Milt Stegall – 2002
18 – Gerald Alphin – 1994
17 – Milt Stegall – 2005
16 – Ernie Pitts – 1959
16 – Dalton Schoen – 2022

Most Receiving Touchdowns – Game
5 – Ernie Pitts – versus Saskatchewan Roughriders, August 29, 1959
4 – Alfred Jackson – versus Edmonton Eskimos, July 14, 1994 
4 – Gerald Alphin – at Shreveport Pirates, October 8, 1994
4 – Arland Bruce – versus Calgary Stampeders, August 23, 2002
4 – Milt Stegall – at Saskatchewan Roughriders, October 6, 2002
4 – Milt Stegall – versus BC Lions, October 10, 2005

Passing 

Most Passing Yards – Career
29,623 – Dieter Brock (1974–1983)
20,175 – Khari Jones (2000–2004)
18,116 – Kevin Glenn (2004–2008)
16,470 – Ken Ploen (1957–1967)
14,977 – Matt Nichols (2015–2019)

Most Passing Yards – Season
5,334 – Khari Jones – 2002
5,114 – Kevin Glenn – 2007
4,796 – Dieter Brock – 1981
4,686 – Tom Clements – 1987
4,682 – Matt Dunigan – 1993

Most Passing Yards – Game
713 – Matt Dunigan – versus Edmonton Eskimos, July 14, 1994
467 – Matt Dunigan – versus BC Lions, July 30, 1992
464 – Tom Burgess – versus Saskatchewan Roughriders, September 8, 1991
462 – Khari Jones – versus Calgary Stampeders, August 23, 2002

Most Pass Completions – Career
2,167 – Dieter Brock (1974–1983)
1,416 – Khari Jones (2000–2004)
1,328 – Kevin Glenn (2004–2008)
1,312 – Matt Nichols (2015–2019)
1,084 – Ken Ploen (1957–1967)

Most Pass Completions – Season
411 – Matt Nichols – 2017
388 – Kevin Glenn – 2007
382 – Khari Jones – 2002
374 – Kerwin Bell – 1999
354 – Dieter Brock – 1981

Most Pass Completions – Game
41 – Dieter Brock – at Ottawa Rough Riders, October 3, 1981
39 – Khari Jones – at BC Lions, September 27, 2002
35 – Matt Nichols – versus Ottawa Redblacks, October 29, 2016
35 – Matt Nichols – at Saskatchewan Roughriders, September 3, 2017
34 – Matt Nichols – at Montreal Alouettes, July 27, 2017

Most Consecutive Pass Completions – Game
19 – Matt Nichols – versus Ottawa Redblacks, July 19, 2019
16 – Dieter Brock – at Ottawa Rough Riders, October 3, 1981

Most Pass Attempts – Career
3,777 – Dieter Brock (1974–1983)
2,346 – Khari Jones (2000–2004)
2,183 – Kevin Glenn (2004–2008)
1,930 – Matt Nichols (2015–2019)
1,916 – Ken Ploen (1957–1967)

Most Pass Attempts – Season
630 – Kerwin Bell – 1999
621 – Kevin Glenn – 2007
620 – Khari Jones – 2002
600 – Matt Dunigan – 1993
595 – Sean Salisbury – 1989

Most Pass Attempts – Game
55 – Sammy Garza – at Ottawa Rough Riders, June 28, 1995
55 – Khari Jones – at BC Lions, September 27, 2002
54 – Kevin Glenn – at Toronto Argonauts, September 23, 2007

Most Passing Touchdowns – Career
187 – Dieter Brock
132 – Khari Jones
119 – Ken Ploen
104 – Jack Jacobs
103 – Kevin Glenn

Most Passing Touchdowns – Season
46 – Khari Jones – 2002
37 – Zach Collaros – 2022
36 – Matt Dunigan – 1993
35 – Tom Clements – 1987
34 – Jack Jacobs – 1952

Most Passing Touchdowns – Game
7 – Jim Van Pelt – at Saskatchewan Roughriders, August 29, 1959
6 – Jack Jacobs – at Calgary Stampeders, October 4, 1952
6 – Sean Salisbury – versus BC Lions, September 10, 1989

Rushing 

Most Rushing Yards – Career
9,987 – Charles Roberts (2001–2008)
8,861 – Leo Lewis (1955–1966)
5,926 – Willard Reaves (1983–1987)
5,736 – Jim Washington (1974–1979)
5,541 – Gerry James (1952–1963)

Most Rushing Yards – Season
1769 – Robert Mimbs – 1991
1733 – Willard Reaves – 1984
1624 – Charles Roberts – 2005
1609 – Charles Roberts – 2006
1554 – Charles Roberts – 2003
1527 – Mack Herron – 1972
1522 – Charles Roberts – 2004
1471 – Willard Reaves – 1987
1396 – Fred Reid – 2010
1390 - Andrew Harris - 2018
1380 - Andrew Harris - 2019
1379 – Charles Roberts – 2007
1371 – Fred Reid – 2009
1341 – Robert Mimbs – 1990
1323 – Willard Reaves – 1985
1289 – Blaise Bryant – 1994
1277 – Jim Washington – 1976
1262 – Jim Washington – 1977
1223 – Dave Raimey – 1966
1205 – Gerry James – 1955
1192 – Gerry James – 1957
1162 – Charles Roberts – 2002
1160 – Leo Lewis – 1958
1153 – Mike Richardson – 1992
1120 – Ronald Williams – 1997
1101 – Bob McNamara – 1956
1076 – Charlie Shepard – 1959
1076 – William Miller – 1982
1053 – William Miller – 1980
1052 – Dave Raimey – 1965
1039 – Chad Simpson – 2012
1035 – Leo Lewis – 1961
1035 - Andrew Harris - 2017
1032 – Jim Washington – 1978
1001 – Brady Oliveira – 2022

Most Rushing Yards – Game
260 – Fred Reid – at BC Lions, August 21, 2009
249 – Blaise Bryant – at Hamilton Tiger-Cats, September 17, 1994
221 – Willard Reaves – versus Ottawa Rough Riders, September 17, 1984
212 – Ronald Williams – at Saskatchewan Roughriders, October 24, 1997

Most Rushing Attempts – Career
1,853 – Charles Roberts (2001–2008)
1,351 – Leo Lewis (1955–1966)
1,110 – Willard Reaves (1983–1987)
991 – Gerry James (1952–1963)
964 – Andrew Harris (2016–2019, 2021)

Most Rushing Attempts – Season
326 – Robert Mimbs – 1991
304 – Willard Reaves – 1984
303 – Charles Roberts – 2006
300 – Charles Roberts – 2004
290 – Charles Roberts – 2005

Most Rushing Attempts – Game
34 – Blaise Bryant – at Hamilton Tiger-Cats, September 17, 1994
32 – Charles Roberts – versus Toronto Argonauts, June 23, 2006

Receiving 

Most Receiving Yards – Career
15,153 – Milt Stegall (1995–2008)
9,036 – James Murphy (1983–1990)
8,341 – Joe Poplawski (1978–1986)
7,200 – Terrence Edwards (2007–2013)
6,286 – Rick House (1979–1991)

Most Receiving Yards – Season
1862 – Milt Stegall – 2002
1746 – James Murphy – 1986
1624 – Gerald Wilcox – 1994
1616 – Milt Stegall – 1997
1499 – Milt Stegall – 2000

Most Receiving Yards – Game
308 – Alfred Jackson – versus Edmonton Eskimos, July 14, 1994
254 – Milt Stegall – at Edmonton Eskimos, July 20, 2006
240 – David Williams – versus Edmonton Eskimos, July 14, 1994
234 – Milt Stegall – versus BC Lions, October 10, 2005
233 – Milt Stegall – at BC Lions, July 29, 1999

Most Receptions – Career
854 – Milt Stegall (1995–2008)
573 – James Murphy (1983–1990)
549 – Joe Poplawski (1978–1986)
469 – Terrence Edwards (2007–2013)
411 – Clarence Denmark (2011–2017)

Most Receptions – Season
116 – James Murphy – 1986
111 – Gerald Wilcox – 1994
106 – Milt Stegall – 2002
105 – Andrew Harris – 2017
100 – Eugene Goodlow – 1981

Most Receptions – Game
15 – Eugene Goodlow – versus Calgary Stampeders, November 1, 1981
13 – James Murphy – at BC Lions, Jun 26, 1986
13 – Derick Armstrong – at Saskatchewan Roughriders – September 2, 2007

Yards from Scrimmage
Most Yards from Scrimmage, career
15,208 - Milt Stegall (55 yards rushing, 15,153 yards receiving)
13,328 - Charles Roberts (9,987 yards rushing, 3,341 yards receiving)
13,112 - Leo Lewis (8,861 yards rushing, 4,251 yards receiving)
9,123 – James Murphy (87 yards rushing, 9,036 yards receiving)
8,341 – Joe Poplawski (8,341 yards receiving)

Most Yards from Scrimmage, one season
2,207 - Robert Mimbs (1991, 1769 yards rushing, 438 yards receiving)
2,140 - Willard Reaves (1984, 1,733 yards rushing, 407 yards receiving)
2,102 - Charles Roberts (2003, 1,554 yards rushing, 548 yards receiving)
2,098 - Charles Roberts (2005, 1,624 yards rushing, 474 yards receiving)
2,020 - Charles Roberts (2006, 1,609 yards rushing, 411 yards receiving)

Most Yards from Scrimmage, one game
308 - Alfred Jackson (1994, 308 yards receiving)
266 - Fred Reid (2009, 260 yards rushing, 6 yards receiving)
263 - Blaise Bryant (1994, 249 yards rushing, 14 yards receiving)

Interceptions 

Most Interceptions – Career
47 – Rod Hill (1988–1992)
34 – Norm Rauhaus (1956–1967)
31 – Gord Rowland (1954–1963)
27 – Reggie Pierson (1978–1983)
27 – Less Browne (1989–1991)
27 – Ken Hailey (1983–1991)

Most Interceptions – Season
14 – Less Browne – 1990
13 – Roy Bennett – 1987
12 – Rod Hill – 1990
12 – Rod Hill – 1989
10 – Ken Ploen – 1959
10 – Less Browne – 1991

Most Interceptions – Game
5 – Rod Hill – versus Edmonton Eskimos, September 9, 1990
4 – Peter Ribbins – versus BC Lions, August 17, 1972

Tackles (Since 1987) 

Most Defensive Tackles – Career
607 – Greg Battle (1987–1993, 1997–1998)
426 – Doug Brown (2001–2011)
375 – Darryl Sampson (1986–1995)
360 – Paul Randolph (1989–1995)

Most Defensive Tackles – Season
124 – Greg Battle – 1989
114 – Greg Battle – 1990
112 – Barrin Simpson – 2007
105 – Adam Bighill – 2018
102 – Khalil Bass – 2015

Most Defensive Tackles – Game
14 – Barrin Simpson – versus Toronto Argonauts, July 24, 2009
14 – Ian Wild – versus Montreal Alouettes, August 22, 2014
13 – Ken Hailey – at Hamilton Tiger-Cats, August 14, 1987
13 – Greg Battle – versus Saskatchewan Roughriders, September 23, 1990
13 – K.D. Williams – at Toronto Argonauts, October 9, 1995

Most Special Teams Tackles – Career
184 – Wade Miller (1995–2005)
124 – Brendan Rogers (1991–1995)
110 – Mike Miller (2017–2019, 2021–22)
84 – Pierre-Luc Labbé (2008–2013)
82 – Wayne Weathers (1998–2002)

Most Special Teams Tackles – Season
37 – Wade Miller – 1999
35 – Wade Miller – 1997
34 – Brendan Rogers – 1994
31 – Brendan Rogers – 1993

Most Special Teams Tackles – Game
7 – Brendan Rogers – at BC Lions, September 23, 1994
7 – Mike Miller – at Ottawa Redblacks, July 5, 2019
6 – Wade Miller – versus Saskatchewan Roughriders, October 24, 1997
6 – Derrick Doggett – versus Montreal Alouettes, August 15, 2009

Quarterback Sacks 

Most Sacks – Career
98 – Tyrone Jones (1983–1991)
59 – Tony Norman (1986–1995)
52 – Doug Brown (2001–2011)
47 – Elfrid Payton (1990–1993, 2000, 2004)
47 – Gavin Walls (2005–2009)

Most Sacks – Season
22 – Elfrid Payton – 1993
20.5 – Tyrone Jones – 1984
17.5 – Tyrone Jones – 1983
17 – Jamaal Westerman – 2015

Most Sacks – Game
4.5 – Tyrone Jones – versus BC Lions, July 22, 1984
4 – Charlie Clemons – versus Saskatchewan Roughriders, October 13, 1995
4 – Gavin Walls – versus BC Lions, October 10, 2005

Field goals 

Most Field Goals – Career
617 – Troy Westwood (1991–2007, 2009)
394 – Trevor Kennerd (1980–1991)
195 – Justin Medlock (2016–2019)
148 – Bernie Ruoff (1975–1979)
114 – Justin Palardy (2010–2013)

Most Field Goals – Season
60 – Justin Medlock – 2016
56 – Justin Medlock – 2017
47 – Troy Westwood – 1992
47 – Troy Westwood – 2003
45 – Troy Westwood – 1993
45 – Troy Westwood – 2000

Most Field Goals – Game
7 – Trevor Kennerd – versus Toronto Argonauts, October 11, 1981
7 – Justin Medlock – at Saskatchewan Roughriders, September 4, 2016
7 – Justin Medlock – at BC Lions, October 14, 2016
7 – Justin Medlock – versus BC Lions, October 28, 2017

Highest Field Goal Accuracy – Career (minimum 75 attempts)
85.5% (195/228) – Justin Medlock (2016–2019)
82.0% (114/139) – Justin Palardy (2010–2013)
72.3% (617/853) – Troy Westwood (1991–2007, 2009)
71.9% (82/114) – Alexis Serna (2008–2010)
66.6% (394/592) – Trevor Kennerd (1980–1991)

Highest Field Goal Accuracy – Season (minimum 30 attempts)
89.4% (42/47) – Justin Medlock – 2018
88.2% (60/68) – Justin Medlock – 2016
87.0% (40/46) – Lirim Hajrullahu – 2014
86.7% (26/30) – Justin Palardy – 2010
86.7% (39/45) – Justin Palardy – 2012

Longest Field Goal
58 – Bernie Ruoff – versus Calgary Stampeders, September 14, 1980
58 – Justin Medlock – versus Montreal Alouettes, June 24, 2016
57 – Justin Medlock – at Hamilton Tiger-Cats, August 12, 2017
57 – Troy Westwood – versus BC Lions, August 23, 1994
57 – Troy Westwood – versus Calgary Stampeders, July 29, 1996

Most Consecutive Field Goals
28 – Justin Medlock (September 30, 2016 – July 13, 2017)
22 – Justin Medlock (July 14, 2016 – September 4, 2016)
16 – Troy Westwood (1996)

References 
2019 Winnipeg Blue Bombers Media Guide
Total football stats Winnipeg Blue Bombers
CFL Record Book 2017
CFL website

Winnipeg Blue Bombers lists
Canadian Football League records and statistics